The lesser moray (Gymnothorax minor) is a moray eel found in the western Pacific Ocean. It was first named by Coenraad Jacob Temminck and Hermann Schlegel in 1846, and is also known as the reticulated moray eel.

References

minor
Fish described in 1846